Oxford International College of Chengdu (CDOIC; 牛津国际公学成都学校) is a British international school in the Bali area of Chenghua District, Chengdu, Sichuan, China. It serves ages 14–18.

The school offers boarding facilities but does not require all students to board. CDOIC offers the A Levels.

References

External links
 Oxford International College of Chengdu
 Oxford International College of Chengdu 

British international schools in China
International schools in Chengdu
Boarding schools in China
Educational institutions established in 2011
2011 establishments in China